Wyndham Goold (1812-1854) was a Member of Parliament (MP) for County Limerick from 1850 to 1854.

Goold was educated at Westminster School and Trinity College, Dublin. He was the son  of Frederick Falkiner Goold, Archdeacon of Raphoe and Caroline  Newcomen, and brother in law of Bishop Hamilton Verschoyle

References 

1812 births
1854 deaths
Members of the Parliament of the United Kingdom for County Limerick constituencies (1801–1922)
UK MPs 1847–1852
UK MPs 1852–1857
People educated at Westminster School, London
Alumni of Trinity College Dublin